Polygamy is legal although rare in Sudan. Sudanese President Omar Hassan al-Bashir has strongly advocated polygamous marriages, with the hopes of boosting the Sudanese population.

References 

Sudan
Sexuality in Sudan